Mily Balakirev began work on his Symphony No. 2 in D minor in 1900, but did not complete the work until 1908.  The premiere of the symphony was conducted by Russian composer Sergei Liapunov, a student of Balakirev, in St. Petersburg in 1909.  Another performance was held in Paris soon afterwards.

Structure 
The work features a standard, four-movement structure:

References 
 Garden, Edward.  CD pamphlet: "Balakirev: Symphony No. 2, Tamara, Overture on Three Russian Themes -- Philharmonia / Evgeny Svetlanov".  Hyperion Records.  London. 1992.

Balakirev 2
Symphonies by Mily Balakirev
1908 compositions
Compositions in D minor